Darreh Badam may refer to:
 Darreh Badam, Fars
 Darreh Badam-e Olya
 Darreh Badam-e Sofla (disambiguation)